During the 1992–93 English football season, Sheffield United competed in the inaugural season of the FA Premier League under manager Dave Bassett.

Season summary
Highlights of the season included a 6–0 home win over Tottenham Hotspur and an opening-day 2–1 win over eventual champions Manchester United. The club also reached the FA Cup semi-final, but were beaten by arch-rivals Sheffield Wednesday. In the victory over Man Utd Brian Deane scored the first ever Premier League goal.

At the end of the season, the newly formed League Managers Association presented its "Manager of the Year" award for the first time, specifically designed to recognise "the manager who made best use of the resources available to him". This award went to United manager Dave Bassett.

Kit
The kit was manufactured by British apparel company Umbro and sponsored by English timber merchant Arnold Laver.

Final league table

Results
Sheffield United's score comes first

Legend

FA Premier League

FA Cup

League Cup

Players

First-team squad

Left club during season

Reserves

Squad statistics

|}

References

Sheffield United
Sheffield United F.C. seasons